Pannawa is a town in Kurunegala District, North Western Province, Sri Lanka. Pannawa is near Kobeigana.

Education
Schools in Pannawa include:
 Pannawa Muslim Central College 
 As-Siraj MMV
 Sinhala Kanista Vidyalaya

Climate

Pannawa has a tropical rainforest climate under the Köppen climate classification. The village's climate is tropical and hot throughout the year. The surrounding rocks play a major role in determining Pannawa's weather, since these rocks retain the heat of the day. The only major change in Pannawa's weather occurs during the monsoons from May to August and October to January. This is the time of year during which heavy rains can be expected. While the city does experience a noticeably drier weather during January and February, it does not qualify as a true dry season because average precipitation in both months is above . In general, temperatures from late November to mid-February are lower than temperatures during the rest of the year.

Pannawa Lake
Pannawa Lake is a large man-made water reservoir constructed by ancient kings. The lake is located on the outskirts of the central business district near the Pannawa Jumma Mosque. The tank is also used as the village's water supply.

References

External links

Populated places in North Western Province, Sri Lanka